Hot Potato is a 1979 Commedia all'italiana film directed by Steno. The film discusses a range of issues such as homophobia in the political left, Anni di piombo violence, working class culture, and the sustainability of Eurocommunism.

Plot
Bernardo Mambelli nicknamed "il Gandi" (Renato Pozzetto) is a PCI militant and pugilist working at a Milanese paint factory. One night, he sees a fascist gang beating a frail young man (Massimo Ranieri). He saves the man and brings him to his house to learn that he is Claudio, a homosexual. With nowhere to go and recovering from the assault, Claudio starts staying at Bernardo's house but a series of typical misunderstandings lead his comrades as well as his girlfriend Maria (Edwige Fenech) to believing that he has "turned gay". Bernardo is now seen as a potential lost cause and the ongoings soon reveal a "hot potato" situation for him.

Cast
 Renato Pozzetto as Bernardo Mambelli nicknamed "il Gandi"
 Massimo Ranieri as Claudio
 Edwige Fenech as Maria
 Mario Scarpetta as Walter
 Clara Colosimo as Elvira, the doorwoman
 Luca Sportelli as Elvira's husband
 Sergio Ciulli as Maravigli 
 Adriana Russo as Maria's best friend 
 Umberto Raho as the doctor
 Ennio Antonelli as laborer

See also
 List of Italian films of 1979

References

External links

1979 films
Italian LGBT-related films
Films directed by Stefano Vanzina
Commedia all'italiana
1979 comedy films
Italian satirical films
Films set in Milan
Italian political satire films
LGBT-related comedy films
1979 LGBT-related films
Working-class culture
1970s Italian films